The  was a period of economic stagnation in Japan caused by the asset price bubble's collapse in late 1991. The term originally referred to the 1990s, but the 2000s (Lost 20 Years, 失われた20年) and the 2010s (Lost 30 Years, 失われた30年) have been included by commentators as the phenomenon continued.

From 1991 to 2003, the Japanese economy, as measured by GDP, grew only 1.14% annually, while average real growth rate between 2000 to 2010 was about 1%, both well below other industrialized nations. Debt levels continued to rise in response to the Global Financial Crisis in Great Recession in 2008, the Tōhoku Earthquake and Tsunami and Fukushima Nuclear Disaster in 2011, and with the COVID-19 pandemic, the subsequent recession in 2020 further damaged the Japanese economy.

Broadly impacting the entire Japanese economy, over the period of 1995 to 2007, GDP fell from $5.33 trillion to $4.36 trillion in nominal terms, real wages fell around 5%, while the country experienced a stagnant price level. While there is some debate on the extent and measurement of Japan's setbacks, the economic effect of the Lost Decades is well established, and Japanese policymakers continue to grapple with its consequences.

Causes

Japan's economic miracle in the second half of the 20th century ended abruptly at the start of the 1990s. The United States led several initiatives in the 1980’s to curtail Japan’s economy. One initiative was called the Semiconductor Accord of 1986, in which market-leading Japanese semiconductor companies were forced to share their IP as well as face US tariffs and penalties. The Plaza Accord of 1985 allowed the US dollar to depreciate significantly, increasing the competitiveness of US products for global trade, while the Japanese Yen quickly rose, making its products less competitive.   Congressional use of Section 301 further pursued the threat of sanctions and the opening of Japanese markets for US companies. By the late 1980s, the Japanese economy experienced an asset price bubble of a massive scale. The bubble was caused by the excessive loan growth quotas dictated on the banks by Japan's central bank, the Bank of Japan, through a policy mechanism known as the "window guidance". As economist Paul Krugman explained, "Japan's banks lent more, with less regard for quality of the borrower, than anyone else's. In doing so they helped inflate the bubble economy to grotesque proportions." Economist Richard Werner writes that external pressures such as the Plaza Accord and the policy of Ministry of Finance to reduce the official discount rate are insufficient in explaining the actions taken by the Bank of Japan.

Trying to deflate speculation and keep inflation in check, the Bank of Japan sharply raised inter-bank lending rates in late 1989. This sharp policy caused the bursting of the bubble, and the Japanese stock market crashed. Equity and asset prices fell, leaving overly-leveraged Japanese banks and insurance companies with books full of bad debt. As a result, bank credit growth stagnated. The financial institutions were bailed out through capital infusions from the government, loans and cheap credit from the central bank, and the ability to postpone the recognition of losses, ultimately turning them into zombie banks. Yalman Onaran of Bloomberg News writing in Salon stated that the zombie banks were one of the reasons for the following long stagnation. Additionally, Michael Schuman of Time magazine wrote that these banks kept injecting new funds into unprofitable "zombie firms" to keep them afloat, arguing that they were too big to fail. However, most of these companies were too debt-ridden to do much more than survive on bail-out funds. Schuman believed that Japan's economy did not begin to recover until this practice had ended.

Eventually, many of these failing firms became unsustainable, and a wave of consolidation took place, resulting in four national banks in Japan. Many Japanese firms were burdened with heavy debts, and it became very difficult to obtain credit. Many borrowers turned to sarakin (loan sharks) for loans.  As of 2012, the official interest rate was 0.1%;  the interest rate has remained below 1% since 1994.

Economic effects
Despite mild economic recovery in the 2000s, conspicuous consumption of the 1980s has not returned to the same pre-crash levels. Japanese firms such as Toyota, Sony, Panasonic, Sharp, and Toshiba, which had dominated their respective industries from the 1960s to the 1990s, had to fend off strong competition from rival firms based in other East Asian countries, particularly South Korea, and China, since the 2000s. In 1989, of the world's top 50 companies by market capitalization, 32 were Japanese; by 2018, only one such company (Toyota) remains in the top 50. Many Japanese companies replaced a large part of their workforce with temporary workers, who had little job security and fewer benefits.  As of 2009, these non-traditional employees made up more than a third of the labor force. For the wider Japanese workforce, wages have stagnated. From their peak in 1997, real wages have since fallen around 13%—an unprecedented number among developed nations. Surveys by the Ministry of Health, Labour and Welfare showed that household income in 2010 had fallen to 1987 levels. According to Teikoku Databank, Japan's largest credit rating agency, the aggregate sales of all companies in Japan decreased by 3.9% in 2010 compared to 2000, or a decrease of 13,848.2 billion yen.

The wider economy of Japan is still recovering from the impact of the 1991 crash and subsequent lost decades. It took 12 years for Japan's GDP to recover to the same levels as 1995. And as a greater sign of economic malaise, Japan also fell behind in output per capita. In 1991, real output per capita in Japan was 14% higher than that of Australia, but in 2011 real output had dropped to 14% below Australia's levels. In the span of 20 years, Japan's economy was overtaken not only in gross output, but labor efficiency, whereas previously it was a global leader in both. In 2018, labor productivity of Japan was the lowest in the G7 developed economies and among the lowest of the OECD. 

In response to chronic deflation and low growth, Japan has attempted economic stimulus and thereby run a fiscal deficit since 1991. These economic stimuli have had at best nebulous effects on the Japanese economy and have contributed to the huge debt burden on the Japanese government. Expressed as a percentage of GDP, at ~240% Japan had the highest level of debt of any nation on earth as of 2013. While Japan's is a special case where the majority of public debt is held in the domestic market and by the Bank of Japan, the sheer size of the debt demands large service payments and is a worrying sign of the country's financial health.

More than 25 years after the initial market crash, Japan was still feeling the effects of Lost Decades. However, several Japanese policymakers have attempted reforms to address the malaise in the Japanese economy. After Shinzo Abe was elected as Japanese prime minister in December 2012, Abe introduced a reform program known as Abenomics which sought to address many of the issues raised by Japan's Lost Decades. His "three arrows" of reform intend to address Japan's chronically low inflation, decreasing worker productivity relative to other developed nations, and demographic issues raised by an aging population. Initially, investor response to the announced reform was strong, and the Nikkei 225 rallied to 20,000 in May 2015 from a low of around 9,000 in 2008. The Bank of Japan has set a 2% target for consumer-price inflation, although initial successes has been hampered by a sales tax increase enacted to balance the government budget. However, the impact on wages and consumer sentiment was more muted. A Kyodo News poll in January 2014 found that 73% of Japanese respondents had not personally noticed the effects of Abenomics, only 28 percent expected to see a pay raise, and nearly 70% were considering cutting back spending following the increase in the consumption tax.

In 2020, Jun Saito of the Japan Center for Economic Research stated that the impact which came from the nation's coronavirus pandemic delivered the "final blow" to Japan's long fledgling economy, which had resumed slow growth in 2018.

Social effects 
While economic commentators tend to see stagnation as a negative phenomenon, qualitative studies conducted in Japan show the opposite. There was a measurable increase in life satisfaction during the Lost Decades. Conversely, during the period of rapid growth in asset prices, no evidence of increased well-being was found in relation to that growth. This is partly due to the asset bubble being a driver for economic inequality, whereas the decades following the bubble's collapse have seen more economic equality and increased social spending by the government. The lessons from Japan align with concepts such as degrowth or qualitative metrics like GNH, which suggest that economic growth is not necessarily an appropriate metric for measuring the success and wellbeing of a society.

Interpretation
Economist Paul Krugman has argued that Japan's lost decades is an example of a liquidity trap (a situation in which monetary policy is unable to lower nominal interest rates because it is already close to zero). He explained how truly massive the asset bubble was in Japan by 1990, with a tripling of land and stock market prices during the prosperous 1980s. Japan's high personal savings rates, driven in part by the demographics of an aging population, enabled Japanese firms to rely heavily on traditional bank loans from supporting banking networks, as opposed to issuing stock or bonds via the capital markets to acquire funds. The cozy relationship of corporations to banks and the implicit guarantee of a taxpayer bailout of bank deposits created a significant moral hazard problem, leading to an atmosphere of crony capitalism and reduced lending standards. In so doing they helped inflate the bubble economy to grotesque proportions." The Bank of Japan began increasing interest rates in 1990 due in part to concerns over the bubble and in 1991 land and stock prices began a steep decline, within a few years reaching 60% below their peak.

Economist Richard Koo wrote that Japan's "Great Recession" that began in 1990 was a "balance sheet recession". It was triggered by a collapse in land and stock prices, which caused Japanese firms to become insolvent. Despite zero interest rates and expansion of the money supply to encourage borrowing, Japanese corporations in aggregate opted to pay down their debts from their own business earnings rather than borrow to invest as firms typically do. Corporate investment, a key demand component of GDP, fell enormously (22% of GDP) between 1990 and its peak decline in 2003. Japanese firms overall became net savers after 1998, as opposed to borrowers. Koo argues that it was massive fiscal stimulus (borrowing and spending by the government) that offset this decline and enabled Japan to maintain its level of GDP. In his view, this avoided a U.S. type Great Depression, in which U.S. GDP fell by 46%. He argued that monetary policy was ineffective because there was limited demand for funds while firms paid down their liabilities.  In a balance sheet recession, GDP declines by the amount of debt repayment and un-borrowed individual savings, leaving government stimulus spending as the primary remedy.

Economist Scott Sumner has argued that Japan's monetary policy was too tight during the Lost Decades and thus prolonged the pain felt by the Japanese economy.

Economists Fumio Hayashi and Edward Prescott argue that the anemic performance of the Japanese economy since the early 1990s is mainly due to the low growth rate of aggregate productivity. Their hypothesis stands in direct contrast to popular explanations that are based in terms of an extended credit crunch that emerged in the aftermath of a bursting asset “bubble.” They are led to explore the implications of their hypothesis on the basis of evidence that suggests that despite the ongoing difficulties in the Japanese banking sector, desired capital expenditure was for the most part fully financed. They suggest that Japan's sluggish investment activity is likely to be better understood in terms of low levels of desired capital expenditure and not in terms of credit constraints that prohibit firms from financing projects with positive net present value (NPV). Monetary or fiscal policies might increase consumption in the short run, but unless productivity growth increases, there is a legitimate fear that such a policy may simply transform Japan from a low-growth/low-inflation economy to a low-growth/high-inflation economy.

In her analysis of Japan's gradual path to economic success and then quick reversal, Jennifer Amyx wrote that Japanese experts were not unaware of the possible causes of Japan's economic decline. Rather, to return Japan's economy back to the path to economic prosperity, policymakers would have had to adopt policies that would first cause short-term harm to the Japanese people and government. Under this analysis,  says Ian Lustick, Japan was stuck on a "local maximum," which it arrived at through gradual increases in its fitness level, set by the economic landscape of the 1970s and 80s. Without an accompanying change in institutional flexibility, Japan was unable to adapt to changing conditions and even though experts may have known which changes needed to be made, they would have been virtually powerless to enact those changes without instituting unpopular policies which would have been harmful in the short-term. Lustick's analysis is rooted in the application of evolutionary theory and natural selection to understanding institutional rigidity in the social sciences.

Legacy
After the Great Recession of 2007–2009, many Western governments and commentators have referenced the Lost Decades as a distinct economic possibility for stagnating developed nations. On February 9, 2009, in warning of the dire consequences facing the  US economy after its housing bubble, U.S. President Barack Obama cited the "lost decades" as a prospect the American economy faced.  And in 2010, Federal Reserve Bank of St. Louis President James Bullard warned that the United States was in danger of becoming "enmeshed in a Japanese-style deflationary outcome within the next several years."

See also

 Economic history of Japan
 Economic stagnation
 Princes of the Yen: book by Richard Werner about the macroeconomics behind the Lost Decade
 Japanese post-war economic miracle
 Zero interest rate policy
 Employment Ice Age
 Great Recession

References

Further reading
 Fletcher III, W. Miles, and Peter W. von Staden, eds. Japan's 'Lost Decade': Causes, Legacies and Issues of Transformative Change (Routledge, 2014)
 Funabashi, Yoichi, and Barak Kushner, eds. Examining Japan's Lost Decades (Routledge, 2015) excerpt
 Hayashi, Fumio, and Edward C. Prescott. "The 1990s in Japan: A lost decade." Review of Economic Dynamics (2002) 5#1 pp: 206-235. online
 Hoshi, Takeo, and Anil K. Kashyap. "Will the US and Europe avoid a lost decade? Lessons from Japan’s postcrisis experience." IMF Economic Review 63.1 (2015): 110-163. online 

Heisei period
1990s in Japan
2000s in Japan
Economic history of Japan
1990s economic history
2000s economic history
Economic collapses
2010s in Japan
2010s economic history